The 2012–13 Creighton Bluejays men's basketball team represented Creighton University during the 2012–13 NCAA Division I men's basketball season. The Bluejays, led by third year head coach Greg McDermott, played their home games at the CenturyLink Center Omaha and were in their final season as members of the Missouri Valley Conference. They finished the season 28–8, 13–5 in MVC play to be Missouri Valley regular season champions. They were also champions of the Missouri Valley tournament, defeating Wichita State in the championship game, to earn an automatic bid to the 2013 NCAA tournament. In the tournament, they defeated Cincinnati in the second round before losing in the third round to Duke.

Following the season, Creighton left the MVC to join the Big East Conference.

Roster

Rankings

Schedule and results 
 
|-
!colspan=12 style="background:#00009C; color:#FFFFFF;"| Exhibition

|-
!colspan=12 style="background:#00009C; color:#FFFFFF;"| Regular season

 
|- 
!colspan=12 style="background:#00009C; color:#FFFFFF;"| 2013 Missouri Valley Conference Men's Basketball tournament
|- 

|- 
!colspan=12 style="background:#00009C; color:#FFFFFF;"| 2013 NCAA tournament
|-

References

Creighton Bluejays
Creighton Bluejays men's basketball seasons
Creighton Bluejays
Blue
Blue